The third season of the animated television series, Archer originally aired in the United States on the cable network FX. The three part episode "Heart of Archness" aired from September 15, 2011 until September 29, 2011. The rest of the season started on January 19, 2012 with "The Man from Jupiter" and ended with the two part episode "Space Race" on March 16, 2012, and March 23, 2012, respectively, with a total of thirteen episodes.

Overview
It was announced on March 29, 2011, that Archer was renewed for 16 more episodes. FX had originally intended the first three episodes of Season 3 to air in the fall of 2011 as a "Special Assignment" three-part event, with a further 13 episodes (a normal sized season for most FX shows) to air at the beginning of 2012.  Series creator Adam Reed later clarified the situation.  He explained that while FX had intended the second set of episodes to be 13 episodes, he had believed that he was only going to be producing a further 10 episodes (with the first three episodes completing the standard order of 13 episodes).  While he attempted to produce the full 16 episodes after he realized his error, it soon became clear that it would be impossible to produce three additional episodes.  The order was eventually reduced to 13 episodes.

Episodes

Home media

References

External links 
 
 

2011 American television seasons
2012 American television seasons
Archer (2009 TV series) seasons